Keep Austin Weird is the slogan adopted by the Austin Independent Business Alliance to promote small businesses in Austin, Texas. It is intended to promote local businesses and is inspired by comments made by Red Wassenich in 2000 while giving a pledge to an Austin radio station. He later began printing bumper stickers and operated the website keepaustinweird.com until his death in 2020 and published Keep Austin Weird: A Guide to the Odd Side of Town.

Despite a challenge from Wassenich, the slogan was later trademarked by Outhouse Designs and used to market T-shirts, hats, and mugs. Other cities have since mimicked the nickname, including Portland in 2003, Louisville in 2005, and Indianapolis in 2013.

A 2010 book on the topic, Weird City: Sense of Place and Creative Resistance in Austin, Texas, discusses the cultural evolution of the "Keep Austin Weird" movement as well as its commercialization and socio-political significance. The origins of Austin's unique culture have been claimed to be the product of unusually cheap housing prices following the end of a housing boom in the 1980s, combined with the location of the University of Texas at Austin in the city.

The Austin Independent Business Alliance is among at least 85 community organizations affiliated with the American Independent Business Alliance, a national non-profit that supports and connects pro-local community-based organizations.

Gallery

See also

 Keep Portland Weird
 Keep Louisville Weird
 Keep Indy Indie

References

Further reading

External links
 

Slogans
Culture of Austin, Texas
Economy of Austin, Texas
Small business
Anti-corporate activism